Huerfano County is a county located in the U.S. state of Colorado. As of the 2020 census, the population was 6,820. The county seat is Walsenburg.  The county, whose name comes from the Spanish huérfano meaning "orphan", was named for the Huerfano Butte, a local landmark. The area of Huerfano County boomed early in the 1900s with the discovery of large coal deposits.  After large scale World War II coal demand ended in the 1940s Walsenburg and Huerfano saw a steady economic decline through 2015.

Historical
Huerfano County was one of the original 17 counties created by the Territory of Colorado on November 1, 1861, and was originally larger than its present size. On November 2, 1870, the Colorado General Assembly created Greenwood County from former Cheyenne and Arapaho tribal land and the eastern portion of Huerfano County.  There are countless reports of vast New Spain and Native American gold treasures that lay hidden in the hills and mountains of Huerfano County including the Arapahoe Princess Treasure.  Two Spanish forts were located in Huerfano County.

Colorado Coalfield War

Huerfano County and neighboring Las Animas County were the central locations of the 1913-1914 United Mine Workers of America strike against the Rockefeller-owned Colorado Fuel and Iron company, which is now referred to as the Colorado Coalfield War.

Walsenburg and other stops on the Colorado and Southern Railway proved strategically important for both strikers and the Colorado National Guard, resulting in multiple gun-battles in around towns with stops.

Geography
The price of property saw an increase of more than 10% after a moratorium on commercial marijuana grows was lifted in July 2015.

Adjacent counties
Pueblo County - northeast
Las Animas County - southeast
Costilla County - southwest
Alamosa County - west
Custer County - northwest
Saguache County - northwest

Major Highways
  Interstate 25

  U.S. Highway 160
  State Highway 10
  State Highway 12
  State Highway 69

Protected areas
Greenhorn Mountain Wilderness
Lathrop State Park
San Isabel National Forest
Sangre de Cristo Wilderness
Spanish Peaks Wilderness

Scenic byway
Highway of Legends Scenic Byway

Attractions and recreation

The county's tourism board brands the county as "Southern Colorado's Spanish Peaks Country." Visitors are attracted to the Spanish Peaks and the many mountain-related activities they offer, such as mountain climbing, hiking, hunting, and sightseeing. In addition, the western part of the county offers the peaks of the Sangre de Cristo Range, a range that includes several fourteeners.

The towns of La Veta and Cuchara offer art galleries and lodging.

A new county park — the Cuchara Mountain Park — opened in 2017, repurposing property that used to be the now-defunct Cuchara Ski Resort.

Huerfano County is a geologist's paradise. Over 500 dikes surround the Spanish Peaks. Many other geological formations, such as the Dakota Formation, are visible in the county.

Lathrop State Park offers hiking, camping, picnicking, and fishing. Adjacent to the park, the city of Walsenburg offers a public, nine-hole golf course.

Demographics

As of the census of 2000, there were 7,862 people, 3,082 households, and 1,920 families residing in the county.  The population density was 5 people per square mile (2/km2).  There were 4,599 housing units at an average density of 3 per square mile (1/km2).  The racial makeup of the county was 80.96% White, 2.75% Black or African American, 2.70% Native American, 0.39% Asian, 0.08% Pacific Islander, 9.41% from other races, and 3.71% from two or more races.  35.14% of the population were Hispanic or Latino of any race.

There were 3,082 households, out of which 25.00% had children under the age of 18 living with them, 48.40% were married couples living together, 10.40% had a female householder with no husband present, and 37.70% were non-families. 32.80% of all households were made up of individuals, and 14.10% had someone living alone who was 65 years of age or older.  The average household size was 2.25 and the average family size was 2.85.

In the county, the population was spread out, with 20.90% under the age of 18, 7.30% from 18 to 24, 27.40% from 25 to 44, 27.40% from 45 to 64, and 17.00% who were 65 years of age or older.  The median age was 42 years. For every 100 females there were 118.80 males.  For every 100 females age 18 and over, there were 122.80 males.

The median income for a household in the county was $25,775, and the median income for a family was $32,664. Males had a median income of $24,209 versus $21,048 for females. The per capita income for the county was $15,242.  About 14.10% of families and 18.00% of the population were below the poverty line, including 23.70% of those under age 18 and 11.90% of those age 65 or over.

Politics
A Democratic stronghold for much of the 20th century, Huerfano has become a competitive swing county in recent elections. After only backing Al Gore by 29 votes in 2000, the county voted for the winner of each presidential race between 2004 and 2016 before narrowly staying in the Donald Trump column in 2020.

Communities

City
Walsenburg

Town
La Veta

Census-designated place
Gardner

Unincorporated communities
Badito
Cuchara
Farisita
Farista
Navajo Ranch
Red Wing

Ghost towns
Calumet
Alamo

See also
 Outline of Colorado
 Index of Colorado-related articles
 National Register of Historic Places listings in Huerfano County, Colorado

References

External links
Huerfano County Government website
Colorado County Evolution by Don Stanwyck
Spanish Peaks Country (Tourism board official website)

 

 
Colorado counties
1861 establishments in Colorado Territory
Populated places established in 1861